Mining Magnate (Simplified Chinese: 半边天)  is a Malaysian 2012 Mandarin drama series produced by MediaCorp for ntv7. It is scheduled to air every Monday to Thursday, at 9:30pm on ntv7, starting 31 October 2012. This 30-episode period drama is set on the iron mining industry. Filming started in June 2012. Besides being their first time in a MediaCorp production, the 2012 Golden Awards Most Popular actress Debbie Goh and Frederick Lee stars as couple for the fifth time, but this time as the main protagonists, alongside Aye Kheng.

References

Chinese-language drama television series in Malaysia
2012 Malaysian television series debuts
2012 Malaysian television series endings
NTV7 original programming